David O'Donoghue may refer to:

 David James O'Donoghue (1866–1917), Irish biographer and editor
 David O'Donoghue (historian) (born 1952), Irish journalist and historian
 Dave O'Donoghue (1885–1960), Australian rules footballer

See also
 David O'Donahue, American general